Macellocerus acuminatus is a species of darkling beetles in the subfamily Tenebrioninae.

Distribution
This species is present in Madagascar.

References

Tenebrioninae
Beetles described in 1833
Insects of Madagascar